Galvanic shock or oral galvanism is a term used for the association of oral symptoms due to electric currents occurring between different types of metal used in amalgam dental fillings and their interactions with the electrolytes in saliva. Otherwise, beyond individual sensitivity to amalgam, producing oral lesions, no associated adverse effects to amalgam have been found. However, Mutter in a German study concluded that "removal of dental amalgam leads to permanent improvement of various chronic complaints in a relevant number of patients in various trials".

The condition of galvanic shock was originally proposed in 1878, and became well known in Sweden during the 1970s and 80s, because of a campaign to raise awareness, and replace dental amalgam fillings containing mercury with other compounds such as ceramic or polymer restorations.

See also 
Burning mouth syndrome
Galvanic corrosion
Dental amalgam controversy

References

Corrosion
Acquired tooth pathology